John R. Rivera (born October 28, 1982) is a Puerto Rican-American professional wrestler and former mixed martial artist. He is currently signed non-exclusively to New Japan Pro-Wrestling (NJPW), better known by his ring name Rocky Romero (ロッキー・ロメロ　Rokkī Romero). Rivera is known for his tenure as the fourth incarnation of Black Tiger and for his accomplishments as a tag team wrestler. He was member of tag teams like The Havana Pitbulls/Los Cubanitos, No Remorse Corps, Forever Hooligans, and Roppongi Vice. Rivera made his in-ring debut on September 13, 1997 and over the years portrayed several different characters, including the masked characters Havana Brother I, Black Tiger and Grey Shadow and has wrestled extensively in Mexico (for both Consejo Mundial de Lucha Libre and Lucha Libre AAA World Wide). In the United States he is most known for his work with Ring of Honor and was one of the featured wrestlers for Lucha Libre USA.

As a singles wrestler, Romero won the CMLL World Super Lightweight Championship on three occasions, the IWGP Junior Heavyweight Championship (as Black Tiger) and the NWA World Junior Heavyweight Championship. In the tag team division, he is a former three-time ROH World Tag Team Champion and a record eight-time IWGP Junior Heavyweight Tag Team Champion. Romero's wrestling style incorporates stiff shoot-style kicks and multiple armlock variations resembling mixed martial arts, competing in lucha libre style events in Mexico early in his career.

Professional wrestling career

Early career (1997–2009) 
Rivera made his wrestling debut in 1997, using the ring name Rocky Romero. He was trained by Antonio Inoki at the NJPW Dojo in Los Angeles. His career has taken him through promotions in the Southern California region to Mexico, where he competed successfully for Consejo Mundial de Lucha Libre (CMLL), the world's oldest wrestling promotion, and in Japan where he has worked most notably in New Japan Pro-Wrestling, (NJPW) where he was chosen to become the fourth incarnation of Black Tiger, the villainous gaijin opponent of Tiger Mask (in this case Tiger Mask IV). On October 8, 2005, Romero, as Black Tiger, defeated Tiger Mask for the IWGP Junior Heavyweight Championship. After a four-month reign, Tiger Mask regained the title from his nemesis. Romero made his debut in Pro Wrestling Noah on March 4, 2007, versus Mushiking Terry, casting into doubt the future of the Black Tiger persona. Romero, however, did compete as Black Tiger in August 2007 in Chikara to compete for the NWA World Junior Heavyweight Championship against champion Mike Quackenbush. At NJPW's Resolution '09 on April 5, Romero lost in a mask vs. title match against Tiger Mask, thus ending his role as Black Tiger.

Consejo Mundial de Lucha Libre (2003–2004, 2008)
In late-2003, Romero began working for Consejo Mundial de Lucha Libre in Mexico, using the name "Havana Brother I, he would team up with Havana Brother II and Havana Brother III to form a three-man team known as Los Havana Brothers. A few months later Los Havana Brothers began working as Rocky Romero, Pinoy Boy and Bobby Quance respectively. On September 12, Romero became CMLL's first-ever World Super Lightweight Champion after defeating Volador Jr. in a tournament final. On November 14, Virus defeated Romero to win the championship, signaling the exit of Los Havana Brothers for the time being. In late 2004 Romero made a surprise return to CMLL and defeated Virus to regain the championship. After the title win he left CMLL again, occasionally defending the championship in Southern California. In 2005, local wrestler Tommy Williams won the Super Lightweight Championship but Romero regained it in January 2006. At that point the championship became inactive, with no mention of it.

In early-2008, Romero returned to CMLL and began working under the name "Grey Shadow", a masked gimmick, without CMLL openly acknowledging that it was Romero under the mask. No official references were given to his past with CMLL, nor any mention of the fact that Romero was a CMLL World Super Lightweight Champion.

Ring of Honor (2004–2005, 2007–2010)

Romero's main exposure in the United States came while he was one-half of the Havana Pitbulls tag team, with partner Ricky Reyes, in Ring of Honor where he and Reyes set a record for the longest reign as ROH Tag Team Champions at 196 days, a record they held until 2005 when it was eclipsed by the team of Austin Aries and Roderick Strong. While in ROH, he and Reyes were also members of Homicide's stable, The Rottweilers. He left the company at the end of 2005 to focus on working in Japan.

He returned on January 26, 2007 by defeating Davey Richards. The following evening, Romero walked out on his longtime partner Reyes in the midst of a match against the Briscoe Brothers. On March 31, Romero was introduced as the newest member of the No Remorse Corps. Romero and new stablemate Davey Richards lost to Jack Evans and Naruki Doi. Rocky Romero has been touring with Noah recently and is currently teaming with Atsushi Aoki in the NTV Jr Heavyweight Cup. He also made his debut for Antonio Inoki's new promotion the Inoki Genome Federation defeating El Blazer. On January 26, 2008, Romero teamed with Davey Richards and defeated the teams of The Age of the Fall (Tyler Black and Jimmy Jacobs), Austin Aries and Bryan Danielson, and Brent Albright and B. J. Whitmer in an Ultimate Endurance match to capture the World Tag Team Championship. Romero and Richards later lost the titles to the Briscoe Brothers, and Romero later left ROH in mid-2008 to once again compete in Mexico. He returned at Final Battle 2009, where he won a match against rival Alex Koslov. They had a rematch on March 26, 2010, in Arizona during WrestleMania weekend, which Koslov won.

Lucha Libre AAA World Wide (2008–2010) 
On October 5, 2008, Romero jumped from CMLL to rival promotion Lucha Libre AAA World Wide (AAA). He made his surprise debut at the promotion's television taping in Puebla, Puebla and was announced as a member of Sean Waltman's D-Generation MEX stable at the show. On July 4, 2010, Romero turned rudo and joined La Legión Extranjera instead. However, just four days later it was reported that Romero had left AAA, after the company had asked him to take a pay cut.

New Japan Pro Wrestling (2010–present)

Return; No Remorse Corps (2010–2012) 

On October 12, 2010, New Japan Pro-Wrestling announced that Romero would return to the promotion in November, teaming with Davey Richards in the Super J Tag League, as a member of the promotion's top heel stable, Shinsuke Nakamura's Chaos. The five-day-long tournament ended on November 13, with Romero and Richards winning their block and advancing to the finals, where they were defeated by their Chaos team mates Jado and Gedo. On May 3, 2011, Romero and Richards unsuccessfully challenged Prince Devitt and Ryusuke Taguchi for the IWGP Junior Heavyweight Tag Team Championship.

On October 10, 2011, at Destruction '11, Romero and Richards defeated Devitt and Taguchi in a rematch to win the IWGP Junior Heavyweight Tag Team Championship for the first time. Romero and Richards made their first successful title defense on November 12 at Power Struggle, defeating the team of Kushida and Tiger Mask. On December 23, Romero unsuccessfully challenged Prince Devitt for the IWGP Junior Heavyweight Championship. On January 4, 2012, at Wrestle Kingdom VI in Tokyo Dome, Romero and Richards lost the IWGP Junior Heavyweight Tag Team Championship back to Devitt and Taguchi. No Remorse Corps regained the title from Apollo 55 on February 12 at The New Beginning. On May 2, Romero and Richards were stripped of the IWGP Junior Heavyweight Tag Team Championship, after travel issues forced Richards to miss the following day's Wrestling Dontaku 2012 event, where the two were scheduled to defend the title against Jyushin Thunder Liger and Tiger Mask.

Forever Hooligans (2012–2015) 

Romero soon reunited with his former AAA partner Alex Koslov. On July 22, the team, dubbed "Forever Hooligans", defeated Liger and Tiger Mask to win the IWGP Junior Heavyweight Tag Team Championship. Romero and Koslov made their first successful title defense on August 26 at a Sacramento Wrestling Federation (SWF) event in Gridley, California, defeating the team of A.J. Kirsch and Alex Shelley. Forever Hooligans made their second successful title defense on October 8 at King of Pro-Wrestling, defeating the Time Splitters (Alex Shelley and Kushida). On October 21, Forever Hooligans entered the 2012 Super Jr. Tag Tournament, defeating Jyushin Thunder Liger and Tiger Mask in their first round match. On November 2, Romero and Koslov were eliminated from the tournament in the semifinals by Apollo 55. On November 11 at Power Struggle, Forever Hooligans lost the IWGP Junior Heavyweight Tag Team Championship to the winners of the Super Jr. Tag Tournament, the Time Splitters, ending their reign at 112 days. On May 3, 2013, at Wrestling Dontaku 2013, Romero and Koslov regained the title from the Time Splitters. They lost the title to Suzuki-gun (Taichi and Taka Michinoku) on October 14 at King of Pro-Wrestling.

On July 27, 2013, Romero and Koslov, returned to ROH, through NJPW's close working relationship, and defeated reDRagon (Bobby Fish and Kyle O'Reilly) to become the new ROH World Tag Team Champions. They lost the title to The American Wolves (Davey Richards and Eddie Edwards) in their first defense on August 3. On September 20 at Death Before Dishonor XI, the Forever Hooligans defeated the American Wolves in a rematch to retain the IWGP Junior Heavyweight Tag Team Championship.

For the first half of 2014, Forever Hooligans received several new shots at the NJPW Junior Heavyweight Tag Team Championship, held by The Young Bucks (Matt and Nick Jackson), but were defeated each time, including in a three-way match, also involving the Time Splitters, on May 10 at Global Wars, a special event co-produced by NJPW and ROH in Toronto.

Roppongi Vice (2015–2017) 

Forever Hooligans broke up in January 2015, when Koslov announced he was taking an indefinite break from professional wrestling. On March 1, Romero revealed he and Trent Baretta were forming a new tag team named Roppongi Vice. On April 5 at Invasion Attack 2015, the team captured the IWGP Junior Heavyweight Tag Team Championship from The Young Bucks. They lost the title back to The Young Bucks on May 3 at Wrestling Dontaku 2015.

In early 2016, it was reported that WWE was interested in signing Romero as both a trainer and a wrestler. However, on January 9, Romero announced he had instead signed a new two-year deal with NJPW. On March 14, 2016 at an ROH television taping, Roppongi Vice won a seven tag team gauntlet match to determine the #1 contenders for ROH World Tag Team Championships by defeating The Young Bucks after entering the match as the seventh team. On April 10 at Invasion Attack 2016, Roppongi Vice defeated Matt Sydal and Ricochet to win the IWGP Junior Heavyweight Tag Team Championship for the second time. They lost the title back to Sydal and Ricochet on May 3 at Wrestling Dontaku 2016. On November 5 at Power Struggle, Roppongi Vice defeated A. C. H. and Taiji Ishimori in the finals to win the 2016 Super Jr. Tag Tournament. On January 4, 2017, at Wrestle Kingdom 11 in Tokyo Dome, Roppongi Vice defeated The Young Bucks to win the IWGP Junior Heavyweight Tag Team Championship for their third time together. Individually, Romero set a new record by winning the title for the seventh time. They lost the title to Suzuki-gun (Taichi and Yoshinobu Kanemaru) at NJPW's 45th anniversary show on March 6, before regaining it on April 27. They lost the title to The Young Bucks on June 11 at Dominion 6.11 in Osaka-jo Hall. On July 2 at G1 Special in USA, Roppongi Vice unsuccessfully challenged The Young Bucks for the title in a rematch. Afterwards, Romero brought up a five-year plan he and Beretta had made three years earlier, which included them winning the IWGP Junior Heavyweight Tag Team Championship and the Super Jr. Tag Tournament, both of which they had already done, as well as Beretta's eventual transition into the heavyweight division. Having failed to regain the IWGP Junior Heavyweight Tag Team Championship, Romero gave Beretta his blessing to move to the heavyweight division, effectively disbanding Roppongi Vice. Roppongi Vice's farewell match took place on September 16 at Destruction in Hiroshima, where they defeated Bullet Club's Chase Owens and Yujiro Takahashi.

Manager of Roppongi 3K (2017–2021) 

Later that same day, Romero announced he was transitioning into the role of a manager and bringing in a new tag team named "Roppongi 3K" to take on the IWGP Junior Heavyweight Tag Team Champions Ricochet and Ryusuke Taguchi. On October 9 at King of Pro-Wrestling, Romero revealed his new team as Sho and Yoh, who defeated Ricochet and Taguchi to become the new IWGP Junior Heavyweight Tag Team Champions. Over the subsequent years Romero managed Roppongi 3K to a second reign with the IWGP Junior Heavyweight Championship, as well as Sho and Yoh winning the 2018 Super Junior Tag Tournament. Romero also teamed up with Roppongi 3K for various multi-man matches while representing Chaos, for tours such as the CMLL/NJPW Fantastica Mania 2018 tour.

On February 10, 2019 Romero wrestled Jeff Cobb for the ROH Television Championship as part of ROH's Bound By Honor PPV, but was defeated.

All Elite Wrestling (2021–Present) 
On the May 24, 2021 episode of AEW Dark: Elevation, as part of the on-going relationship between All Elite Wrestling (AEW) and New Japan Pro Wrestling, Romero made his debut for the promotion defeating JD Drake. After the match, Romero briefly reunited with his former Roppongi Vice partner Beretta as he saved Romero from an attack by Ryan Nemeth, Peter Avalon and Cezar Bononi as their theme music played and they embraced in the ring. Romero also wrestled a singles match against Bryan Danielson on the November 10, 2021 episode of AEW Dynamite.

Impact Wrestling (2021–2022) 
At Bound for Glory on October 23, 2021, Romero made an unannounced appearance as a participant in the Call Your Shot Gauntlet match, which he failed to win as he was eliminated by Rohit Raju. On the October 28 episode of Impact!, Romero failed to win the Impact X Division Championship from Trey Miguel. In 2022, Romero returned for a match against Eddie Edwards which he failed to win.

Championships and accomplishments

Championship Wrestling From Hollywood
UWN Television Championship (1 time)
Percy Pringle Memorial Cup (2016) 
Consejo Mundial de Lucha Libre
CMLL World Super Lightweight Championship (3 times)
Copa Bicentenario (2022) - with Místico
NWA World Historic Welterweight Championship (1 time, current)
DDT Pro-Wrestling
Ironman Heavymetalweight Championship (2 times)
Empire Wrestling Federation
EWF Tag Team Championship (5 times) – with Ricky Reyes
International Wrestling Council
IWC Tag Team Championship (1 time)
Lucha Libre Internacional Independiente 
LLII Championship (1 time)
Mach One Pro Wrestling
M1W The Hall Of Fame Cup (2011)
Millennium Pro Wrestling
MPW Tag Team Championship (1 time) – with Ricky Reyes
National Wrestling Alliance
NWA World Junior Heavyweight Championship (1 time)
New Japan Pro-Wrestling
IWGP Junior Heavyweight Championship (1 time)
IWGP Junior Heavyweight Tag Team Championship (8 times) – with Davey Richards (2) Alex Koslov (2), and Beretta (4)
Best of the American Super Juniors (2006)
Super Jr. Tag Tournament (2016) – with Beretta
Pro Wrestling Illustrated
Ranked No. 11 of the top 500 singles wrestlers in the PWI 500 in 2002
Ring of Honor
ROH World Tag Team Championship (3 times) – with Ricky Reyes (1), Davey Richards (1), and Alex Koslov (1)
Trios Tournament (2005) – with Ricky Reyes and Homicide
SoCal Uncensored
Tag Team of the Year (2001) with Ricky Reyes
Toryumon
Young Dragons Cup Tournament (2004)
Ultimate Pro Wrestling
UPW Tag Team Championship (1 time) – with Ricky Reyes
WrestleCircus
Big Top Tag Team Championship (1 time) – with Beretta
 Other titles
 Talk 'N Shop A Mania 24/7 Championship (1 time)

Luchas de Apuestas record

Mixed martial arts record

|-
| Loss
|align=center|0-1
| Masahito Kakihara
|Submission (kneebar)
|JF 3 - Jungle Fight 3
|
|align=center|1
|align=center|0:20
|Manaus, Brazil
|

References

Media
Let the Gates of Hell Open: The Best of The Rottweilers – ROH DVD

External links

1982 births
American male professional wrestlers
American male mixed martial artists
American mixed martial artists of Cuban descent
Chaos (professional wrestling) members
Cuban male professional wrestlers
Cuban male mixed martial artists
Expatriate professional wrestlers in Japan
IWGP Junior Heavyweight champions
Living people
Mixed martial artists utilizing wrestling
Professional wrestling announcers
ROH World Tag Team Champions
IWGP Junior Heavyweight Tag Team Champions
CMLL World Lightweight Champions
Ironman Heavymetalweight Champions
20th-century professional wrestlers
21st-century professional wrestlers
NWA World Junior Heavyweight Champions
NWA World Historic Welterweight Champions